Darnell Hunt (born 1962) is an American sociologist and academic administrator. As of September 1, 2022, Darnell Hunt is UCLA’s executive vice chancellor and provost. He has served as the dean of Social Sciences at the University of California, Los Angeles, where he is also a professor of Sociology and African American Studies, and the former director of the Ralph J. Bunche Center for African American Studies. He is the author or editor of four books, and annual reports on the lack of diversity in the film industry.

Education
Darnell Hunt received a Bachelor of Arts in journalism (public relations) from the University of Southern California in 1984 and a Master of Business Administration from Georgetown University in 1988. He then earned a Master of Arts and a PhD both in sociology from the University of California, Los Angeles in 1991 and 1994, respectively.

Career
Hunt began teaching at UCLA in 1991, initially as a graduate student; he later became a full professor of Sociology and African American Studies. He was the chair of the Sociology department, and the director of the Ralph J. Bunche Center for African American Studies, where he was succeeded by History professor Kelly Lytle Hernandez. Since July 2017, Hunt has served as the dean of Social Sciences.

Hunt is the author of two books, and the editor of two more books. He has also published an annual report on the lack of diversity in the film industry since 2014. The 2017 report, which was commissioned by the Color of Change, a non-profit civil rights advocacy organization, showed that very few television writers were black. To increase their share, Hunt suggested television producers use the Rooney Rule during their interviewing process.

His first book, Screening the Los Angeles "Riots:" Race, Seeing and Resistance, looks at the way white, black and Hispanic television viewers understood the 1992 Los Angeles riots. In a review for Contemporary Sociology, professor S. Craig Watkins of the University of Texas at Austin called it "a highly original, insightful, and essential piece of research." However, in a review for the Revue française de sociologie, Julien Damon regretted that Hunt did not look at the way Koreans were impacted by the riots; he added that other axes of subjectivity than race like "age, sex, profession and income levels" would have made the analysis more comprehensive. His second book, O.J. Simpson Facts and Fictions: News Rituals in the Construction of Reality, is about the O. J. Simpson murder case.

Hunt subsequently edited two books. His third book, Channeling Blackness: Studies on Television and Race in America, was about the way blacks are portrayed on television. His fourth book, Black Los Angeles:  American Dreams and Racial Realities, co-edited with Ana-Christina Ramón, the Assistant Director of the Ralph J. Bunche Center for African American Studies, is a collection of seventeen articles about South Los Angeles and Leimert Park. The Journal of American History published a mixed review by Lawrence B. de Graaf, a History professor at California State University, Fullerton. For de Graaf, "This book should be in any collection on recent African American life and on Los Angeles, but next to more comprehensive historical works." In particular, he criticized the lack of attention paid to blacks who live just outside Los Angeles, or to the black middle class. Reviewing it for The Journal of African American History, John H. Barnhill praised the book, writing "Scholarly excellence characterizes many of the articles." He concluded, "the volume provides a great deal of direction for those seeking to understand the background to and current state of the African American urban experience in the 21st century."

Works

References

Living people
University of Southern California alumni
McDonough School of Business alumni
University of California, Los Angeles alumni
University of California, Los Angeles faculty
American university and college faculty deans
American sociologists
African-American social scientists
1962 births
21st-century African-American people
20th-century African-American people